The 2014 FIBA 3x3 World Tour was an international 3x3 basketball between 3x3 basketball teams. The tournament is organized by FIBA.

The Grand Final of the 2014 FIBA 3x3 World Tour was held in Sendai, Japan on 11–12 October.

The winners of an event organised in Japan, the winners of the Beijing Masters and the best two teams from the other Masters fought for two days for the pride to represent their city, the 20,000 USD winners' cheque and a chance to be crowned FIBA 3x3 World Tour Champions.

A win at the FIBA 3x3 World Tour Final also means a guaranteed spot at the 2014 FIBA 3x3 All-Stars, held in Doha, Qatar on 12 December and whose prize money and appearance fee reached a grand total of 120,000 USD.

The fans also get to see a Dunk Contest and the Samsung Shoot-Out Contest, exhibition games and live performances from DJs, dancers and other street artists.

Finals Qualification
Six Masters Tournaments were held in six cities in six countries. 12 teams participated in the finals to be which was held in Sendai, Japan on October 11–12. Best teams from each masters tournament qualified for the finals.

Final standing

 
FIBA 3x3 World Tour seasons
2014 in 3x3 basketball